Gwen Marcus (born 1957) is an American representational sculptor who works primarily in bronze. She is a Fellow of the National Sculpture Society.

Early life 
Marcus began exhibiting her artwork at the age of nine, in 1966. She attended New York University, the Rhode Island School of Design and Art Students League, National Academy of Design.

Collections 
Her works are held in the collections of Brookgreen Gardens, the Chimei Museum (Taiwan), Cape Cod Museum of Art, Long Island Museum of American Art, Firebirds Baseball Field, Braves Baseball Field and Stamford Hospital.

Awards 
She has received the following awards:Gold Medal of Honor, Audubon Artist, Inc Gold Medal, Hudson Valley Art Association
Gold Medal of Honor and the American Professional League
Gold Medal of Honor.

References 

1957 births
Living people
20th-century American women artists
American sculptors
New York University alumni
Rhode Island School of Design alumni
21st-century American women artists